(1513–1572) was a defender of the Kono house in feudal Japan, and the father of Hiraoka Michiyori.

References

1513 births
1572 deaths
Samurai